Thomas Peet Pratt (28 August 1873 – 1935) was an English professional footballer who played as an inside forward.

Career
Pratt started playing for Fleetwood Rangers in 1894, before moving to Grimsby Town in 1895. He then was signed by Preston North End in 1896 where stayed for the next three seasons. Pratt then signed for Tottenham Hotspur in 1899. He was the top scorer while he was at Tottenham, scoring 54 goals in 60 appearances. However, he did not feel settled at the club, and returned to Preston in 1900. He stay in Preston until July 1903. In August 1903, Pratt signed for Arsenal. He made his debut for Arsenal in the opening game of the season in a 3–0 win against  Blackpool. In all, Pratt played 10 times for Arsenal and scored one goal. He subsequently joined Fulham in August 1904.

References

1873 births
1935 deaths
People from Fleetwood
English footballers
Association football inside forwards
Fleetwood Rangers F.C. players
Grimsby Town F.C. players
Preston North End F.C. players
Tottenham Hotspur F.C. players
Fleetwood Town F.C. players
Arsenal F.C. players
Fulham F.C. players
Blackpool F.C. players
English Football League players